Baška is a municipality and village in Frýdek-Místek District in the Moravian-Silesian Region of the Czech Republic. It has about 3,900 inhabitants.

Administrative parts
Villages of Hodoňovice and Kunčičky u Bašky are administrative parts of Baška.

Etymology
The name is probably derived from personal name Baška. According to less probable theories, the name is derived from the folk name for the sheep that were bred here.

Geography
Baška is situated on both sides of the historical border between Moravia and Silesia; Hodoňovice and Kunčičky u Bašky lies in Moravia and the village of Baška in Silesia. It lies in the Moravian-Silesian Foothills on the Ostravice River.

On the northeast edge of the municipality there is the Baška Reservoir. The reservoir is used for recreational purposes and as a water source for industry in case of emergency.

History
The first written mention of Baška is from 1434. The village was probably founded several decades earlier. Politically it belonged to the Duchy of Teschen, a fee of the Kingdom of Bohemia, which after 1526 became part of the Habsburg monarchy. In 1573 it was sold as one of 16 villages and the town of Frýdek, and formed a state country split from the Duchy of Teschen.

After World War I and fall of Austria-Hungary it became a part of Czechoslovakia. In March 1939 it became a part of Protectorate of Bohemia and Moravia. After World War II it was restored to Czechoslovakia.

In 1961, the municipalities of Hodoňovice and Kunčičky u Bašky were joined to Baška.

References

External links

 

Villages in Frýdek-Místek District